Neoroepera  is a genus of plants in the Picrodendraceae first described as a genus in 1866. The entire genus is endemic to the State of Queensland in northeastern Australia.

Species
 Neoroepera banksii Benth. - Shire of Cook
 Neoroepera buxifolia Müll.Arg. - Gladstone District

References

Picrodendraceae
Malpighiales genera
Endemic flora of Australia
Flora of Queensland